Meg Griffin (born March 23rd) is a fictional character in the animated television series Family Guy. Meg is the eldest child of Peter and Lois Griffin and older sister of Stewie and Chris, but is also the family's scapegoat who receives the least of their attention and tolerates the brunt of their abuse. She is often bullied, belittled, ridiculed, and ignored.

Meg first appeared on television, along with the rest of the Griffin family, in a 15-minute short on December 20, 1998. She was created and designed by Family Guy creator Seth MacFarlane, who was asked to pitch a pilot to the Fox Broadcasting Company, based on The Life of Larry and Larry & Steve, two shorts made by MacFarlane featuring a middle-aged man named Larry and an intellectual dog, Steve. After the series pilot was given the greenlight, the Griffin family appeared in the episode "Death Has a Shadow".

Originally voiced by Lacey Chabert during the first season, Meg has been voiced by Mila Kunis since season 2.

Personality 
Meg is a self-conscious and insecure adolescent girl. She is treated unfairly and abused by various people and has numerous insecurities that prompt her to try to be part of the "in-crowd". However, this only results in her getting rebuffed by the many bullies of this circle, particularly Connie D'Amico, the head cheerleader of the local high school, James Woods Regional High School. However, a nerdy Jewish student named Neil Goldman is attracted to her.

Meg is usually the butt of Peter's jokes due to her unpopularity and "ugliness"; Peter resorts to outrageous stunts and names. Stewie and Brian tend to disdain her kindness, but they typically do it behind Meg's back. Lois constantly puts Meg down, while boosting her own ego. Lois is usually of little to no help to Meg when she is abused by others; though her attitude is more negligent or apathetic than the more overt and direct abuse given by Peter.

While Meg is usually a pushover, she can get angry when pushed too far, though such occasions are usually rare. This can be seen in the episode "Seahorse Seashell Party", where she strongly insults and defames Peter, Lois, and even Chris for their inconsiderate actions toward her. This causes Peter, Lois, and Chris to distance themselves in shame and sends Peter into depression; though she later apologizes upon realizing that the family needs a "lightning rod" to absorb the dysfunction. In the episode "Road to Rupert", Meg assaults a man for insulting her after a fender-bender.

Despite her persistent mistreatment, Meg has proven a variety of times throughout the series that she is more talented and has greater potential than most people bother to realize, such as bird calls, playing the saxophone, singing in foreign languages, and even sports such as bowling, field hockey, basketball, roller derby, and even Olympic sports. However, she has yet to earn any notable accolades for these abilities, mostly due to her family's lack of regard or interest in her or her inability to stick up against them.

Many of the show's storylines about Meg involve her trying to improve her life, find a boyfriend, being a Russian sleeper agent, and reaching breaking points with her family and others who victimize her. She often becomes obsessed with men who show any kindness or affection to her, including the Griffin's friend and neighbor Joe Swanson in the episode "The Hand That Rocks the Wheelchair", and Brian in "Barely Legal".

Out of all the members of the family, her father Peter abuses her the most, however he is shown to actually care about Meg in various episodes, such as in "Meg and Quagmire" when he goes out of his way to prevent friend and neighbor Glenn Quagmire from having sex with her, and in "This Little Piggy" where he tries to get Meg out of a foot fetishism business objectifying her for men's sexual amusement. Peter occasionally cares about Meg but is not open about it to anyone.

Voice actors 
On the season 1 DVD commentary for the Drawn Together episode "Hot Tub", Cree Summer claims she was offered the role to play Meg but was dismissed by the producers. Meg was voiced by an uncredited Lacey Chabert for the first season, and by Mila Kunis in subsequent seasons after Chabert became busy with school and her role on Party of Five, although some of her work became second season episodes due to production order. Mila Kunis won the role after a series of auditions and callbacks where she was asked to speak more slowly and enunciate more; she was ultimately hired despite being unsure she understood what was expected of her. MacFarlane felt that Kunis invigorated the character, and that her work on That '70s Show showed she could command a scene. MacFarlane stated that Kunis "had a very natural quality to Meg" and she's "in a lot of ways [...] almost more right for the character". Kunis' voice is first heard as Meg in Episode 3 of season two "Da Boom", and the voices switch back and forth in the broadcast order until settling on Kunis. Tara Strong provides Meg's singing voice in "Don't Make Me Over". Archival recordings of Lacey Chabert's voice that she provided as Meg Griffin are used in the tenth season episode "Back to the Pilot" in which Brian and Stewie go back in time to the events of "Death Has a Shadow". However, Chabert does in fact return for the eleventh season episode "Yug Ylimaf" as Stewie references the fact that time has reversed so much that Meg's voice has reverted back from that of Kunis' to Chabert's.
Lacey Chabert (1999–2000; 2011 archive recordings, 2012)
Mila Kunis (1999–present)
Tara Strong (singing voice)

Social life 
Meg is very unpopular in high school due to both her plain appearance and personality. She desperately tries to be part of the cool crowd, but is usually coldly rebuffed. Because of her eagerness for acceptance, she has been recruited "unknowingly" into a suicidal religious cult, and later recruited again unwittingly into her school's Lesbian Alliance (in the episode "Brian Sings and Swings" ). However, Meg does have a moderate number of friends, the best of whom being a group of girls who are often seen with her during occasions such as her slumber parties and gossiping about boys. In later episodes, these girls, known by the names Beth, Patty, Collette, Esther, and Ruth, are characterized as being highly unpopular and dateless, much like Meg.

Meg is so unpopular at school that one student fires a nail gun into his own abdomen twice (in shop class) in order to avoid a date with her, and then in a later episode, another student shoots his own brother as an excuse not to go to a dance with her the following night. In "Don't Make Me Over", Lois is looking for new clothes for Meg, but with no luck; a saleswoman ends up pouring gasoline on herself, lighting a match, catching fire, and then jumping out of a window after looking at Meg in a pair of jeans. However, she is sought by nerd Neil Goldman. In "8 Simple Rules for Buying My Teenage Daughter", Neil starts dating a girl named Cecilia, Meg becomes instantly jealous and pretends to date Jake Tucker to make him jealous. This leads to her signing a contract to become Neil's girlfriend and (not knowing at first) his slave, but she gets him to tear up the contract after Lois seduces him. Perverted neighbor Glenn Quagmire has shown a repeated interest in her, mostly due to his very low standards, asking if she has reached the age of consent. Quagmire comes close to succeeding in "Meg and Quagmire" when Lois tells Peter to back off after he was ruining Meg and Quagmire's 'dates'. Then, they rescue Meg after Glenn takes her to his cabin, Peter and Lois arriving in time before anything happens. In several episodes she is shown dating, including stories with characters Mayor Adam West and nudist Jeff Campbell. She also loses her virginity unknowingly on live television to Saturday Night Live host Jimmy Fallon after having a drastic makeover; but, before all that happens, she goes out with a rebel at her school named Craig Hoffman. In "Jerome is the New Black", Jerome, an old flame of Lois's and Peter's new friend, admits to having sex with Meg, to which Peter replies indifferently.

In the episode "Brian Sings and Swings", a lesbian student named Sarah invites Meg to join in her Lesbian Alliance Club, with Meg not knowing at first what kind of club it was. Desperate to fit in, she pretends to be a lesbian and also pretends to be attracted to Sarah and even goes so far as to kiss her to prove it. At the end of the episode, Meg goes over to Sarah's house to admit she lied about being a lesbian (Sarah thought that Meg came over to have sex and even undresses when Meg is telling her that she lied), much to Glenn's (who was hiding in Sarah's closet) disappointment. She also used to have a crush on anchorman Tom Tucker, but it ended after she discovered his vanity and selfishness. In other episodes, she is portrayed as chronically incapable of finding a boyfriend. For her Junior Prom she accepts a pity date from Brian, the family dog and only after threatening suicide.

Earlier in season 2, she dated Joe Swanson's son Kevin Swanson, but in "Stew-Roids" it is mentioned that Kevin died in Iraq. In the episode, "Prick Up Your Ears", she dates a boy named Doug, but he breaks up with her when he sees her naked right before almost having sex. In the episode "Peter's Daughter", Meg falls in love with a medical student named Michael Milano after coming out of a short coma (caused by Peter when he asked her to "rescue" beer and make him a sandwich out of an already flooded kitchen) and they start to date. After he breaks up with Meg (because of Peter being overprotective of her after promising that if she came out of the coma, he would "treat her like a princess"), she announces that she is pregnant by Michael and the two get engaged. After finding out that she is not actually pregnant, Meg tells Michael the truth hoping that he will stay, however, Michael quickly leaves Meg at the altar. In the episode "Dial Meg for Murder", she is dating a convict, while in the episode "Go, Stewie, Go!" she dates an attractive young man named Anthony, who is absolutely normal (much to the surprise of many of the other characters). They were so shocked that they had to do tests just to see if he was completely normal which annoyed Meg. It is presumed that she broke up with him after he and Lois had an affair. Meg also shows extremely possessive behavior when she encounters someone she believes she has a romantic connection with such as kidnapping Brian and detaining Bonnie Swanson at the airport by planting a gun in her purse.

Overall, Meg has shown romantic interest in and dated several men throughout the series. However, there have been several instances in which she has shown hints of being bisexual or a lesbian: examples of this include "Brian Sings and Swings", "Stew-Roids", and "Dial Meg for Murder".

In November 2016, when asked by Splitsider if the writers will further develop the characters of Chris and Meg in future episodes, showrunner Alec Sulkin confirmed that the series crew members are working on doing so and added that there are plans for an episode where Meg comes out as a lesbian, taking inspiration from previous instances in which she exhibited signs of lesbian characteristics, like when she joins a lesbian alliance group at school in "Brian Sings and Swings" and is identified as a "transgender man" named "Ron" in Stewie Griffin: The Untold Story, the latter which takes place in the future. However, Sulkin also noted that the plotline has not yet been finalized and thus isn't officially set to be used in an episode.

Family life 
In the first three seasons of the show, Meg was portrayed with a more whiny and uptight personality who was often embarrassed by the family’s acts of bumbling and stupidity, though they cared for her and meant well. In the post-cancellation seasons, this began to change as the inadvertent embarrassment became deliberate bullying and disrespect. Additionally, the show started to flesh out the characters to the point where it appears that most of the population of Quahog who knows her, or even just meets her, picks on or disdains her for no reason other than her simply being "Meg". This basically means that she is a victim of circumstance, as Meg is normally docile and well-behaved and never seems to do anything mean or inconsiderate. In an interview, Mila Kunis stated: "Meg gets picked on a lot. But it's funny. It's like the middle child. She is constantly in the state of being an awkward 16-year-old, when you're kind of going through puberty and what-not. She's just in perpetual mode of humiliation, and it's fun."

While Meg is, in reality, the least obnoxious or self-involved of the family, she is also the least respected and most misunderstood, often shown by people avoiding her company, disparaging her in person, gathering in her bedroom to read her diary for laughs, etc. Peter reminds Lois, "We agreed that if we could only save two, we'd leave Meg!" even randomly shooting her when she simply said "Hi Dad" ("Peter's Daughter") but despite this he also was going to say "I love you" in "Hell Comes to Quahog", and in "Road to Rupert" he stated they were 'secret best friends' before throwing lemonade in her face, saying he would have to continue to treat her badly in public in order to maintain his reputation due to "peer pressure", thus giving hope that they may be on good terms. Occasionally, when Meg asks a question to Peter or just speaks when he is in the room, Peter responds by saying "Shut up, Meg", which is immediately followed by a line from another character.

When the family tries an anger management technique of writing letters and not sending them, Meg finds Peter's letter to her, which says, "Dear Meg, for the first four years of your life, I thought you were a house cat." And in Peter's short story of her birth, they had to go back to get her once they realized they grabbed the afterbirth. In the episode "Stewie Kills Lois", Peter tells guests on a cruise ship about how he and Lois had gone to get an abortion but decided against it when they arrived at the clinic and found out the abortionist had one hand. He then says "two and a half months later, our daughter Meg was born" – indicating that they had tried to abort her when Lois was already over six months pregnant. Another hint to this is when Meg is in the car with Lois and at an attempt to make civilized conversation, says, "Hey Meg, did you know that if you're on birth control and you take an antibiotic it makes it not work? 'Cause no one told me! I just thought you should know" and laughs awkwardly. On Meg's 17th birthday, her mother and father both try to hide from Meg that they do not remember her age. Peter states that Meg sucks in the episode "PTV", and Chris says that people think the same thing about her in "Long John Peter". In "Not All Dogs Go to Heaven", Brian says to Meg's face that she lives in a home "where nobody respects or cares about [her], not even enough to get [her] a damn mumps shot!" Chris, however, has more of a typical brother-sister relationship with Meg, with Chris telling those who condemn her that it is never her fault. Chris, at one point, threatened to quit his job at the local mini-mart if his boss didn't re-hire Meg (at the insistence of Lois). Like Chris, Meg has an anthropomorphic monkey in her closet, and although she has proved it, her father coldly state that they were talking about Chris', not hers. Cleveland comments to Peter "Meg is my least favorite of your children."

Apparently, a double standard also exists against Meg, further underscoring the mistreatment she suffers from the people around her. In "Big Man on Hippocampus", an episode wherein Peter loses his memory, as he reacquaints himself with the pleasures of sex, Lois tells him that it is inappropriate to have sex with his own children; in response, Meg attempts an incest joke. She then lambastes her for this and kicks her out of the room. However, in the season finale "Partial Terms of Endearment", Lois tells a joke that implies that it was Meg that gave birth to Stewie, and apart from a shocked reaction from the latter, Lois receives no such violent reaction. Additionally, in "Model Misbehavior", when Lois starts a modeling career, Peter states that he will pleasure himself to Lois' pictures, followed by Chris and Meg both exclaiming "Me too!" to which Peter shouts "Oh God, Meg, that's sick! That's your mother!", ignoring the fact that Chris said the same thing first. Meg responded by saying "I was only trying to fit in!" Peter immediately kicked her out of the house. Later, during an unrelated conversation, when she tried to insight Peter on how Lois' behavior from modeling made a poor example for women, he said "Meg, who let you back in the house?"

Brian's attention initially softens the lack of respect from Peter and the rest of family; he admits that he cares for Meg when she goes out with Mayor Adam West. While initially seeming to have more common decency for Meg than most people, this appears to almost completely disappear after the tenth season, as Brian's increasingly shallow and self-centered character begins to take more pleasure and joy in being rotten to Meg and often refuses to give her the time of day, such as desperately trying to avoid having to comfort her, rejecting an offer by Peter to be Meg's godfather, attempting to pin the blame on (or trying to frame) her for a misdeed, finding humor in her being puked on, and even willing to deliberately urinate on her bed. Meg's most complicated relationship among the family members after Peter would be with her mother Lois. Although not as abusive as Peter, Lois seldom (if ever) reprimands her husband for their treatment of their daughter and tends to be rather thoughtless of Meg herself, often putting her down for her lack of social achievement or social popularity. Throughout the series, Lois can best be described as a general foil to her daughter, being more rebellious, outgoing, and loose-spirited compared to her daughter's own uptight demeanor, easily-embarrassed personality, and lack of confidence. Before the more recent seasons of the series, Lois has also often shown sympathy for Meg and tried to boost her confidence in terms of teenage social matters. Occasionally however, such occasions resulted in the former getting carried away and stealing the show, for example, taking her to Spring Break at the beach, only for her former younger wild side to kick in and completely exclude Meg from the excitement. Lois would very often comfort Meg when she is down; however, she gives up one attempt after 45 minutes and gives her a Sylvia Plath novel and a bottle of Ambien, and with a "Whatever happens, happens", leaves Meg to her misery.
One of the most cruel examples of the family's lack of humanity or gratitude for Meg comes in the episode "You Can't Do That On Television, Peter". When Peter is mauled by a puma, Meg uses medical training to save his life. However, no one thanks her afterward and when she tries to point it out, Peter just tells her to get him water.

The family's treatment of Meg finally reaches her limit in "Dial Meg for Murder" when Meg emerges from a short stint in a Young Offenders Institution as a hardened criminal, abusing her family and beating up anyone who makes fun of her. It is only after a conversation with Brian that she changes her ways. However, it comes to a head once again in "Seahorse Seashell Party", when Meg finally grows tired of her mistreatment and lashes out against Lois and Peter, informing them of their own flaws. Lois condescendingly tells Meg that she is simply taking her own problems out on everyone else invoking Meg to bring up her mother's delinquent past. Meg tells her that she is far from the perfect parent, harshly berates her for constantly and ruthlessly pointing out Meg's shortcomings. Lois tries to justify that she's a better person because of her past and she is open that she isn't the perfect parent, but Meg tells her that she's the farthest thing from and states how she has neglected to guide her through life and navigate her through the hardships and difficulties of being a young woman. Meg also informs Lois that when she turns 18, she may never want to see her again. This breaks Lois' heart and she finally admits that she's been a terrible mother to Meg. Finally, Meg turns on Peter who, unable to comprehend her insults, thinks that his daughter's argument is amusing, even when she points out Peter's destructive tendencies and that he would go to jail if someone could witness his negative treatment towards her. It dawns on Peter that he is being insulted when Meg calls him a "waste of a man." A disillusioned Peter asks Lois to tell Meg to "knock it off", but Lois refuses because he didn't stick up for her. Within moments, Peter turns his abusive criticisms and insults on Chris and Lois. Peter finally runs to his room crying, with Lois running after him, leaving behind Meg and Brian, who is now fully recovered from his trip, to discuss what just happened. Brian likes that Meg stood up for herself, but she sadly tells him that even though she meant every word, seeing Peter turn on everyone like wolves has made her think that it is ultimately her non-ideal role to serve as the Griffins' "lightning rod that absorbs all the dysfunction". He commends her on her maturity, and even goes on to say that Meg is the "strongest person" in the family. She soon apologizes to the others and says that she is actually the one at fault.

Since this episode, the abuse that Meg receives begins to fade away as a storyline. She also notices that Peter's pro wrestler sister Karen treats Peter exactly the way Peter treats her, and they bond over this with a plan to embarrass Karen at a wrestling show—which goes awry when Meg hits her with a metal folding chair instead of a breakaway one and injures Karen to the point where she ends up in a coma and (as it is implied) possibly will die from her injuries without a blood transfusion.

Notes

References

External links 
 Meg Griffin at Fox.com

Family Guy characters
Teenage characters in television
Fictional characters from Rhode Island
Television characters introduced in 1999
Animated characters introduced in 1999
Animated human characters
Child characters in animated television series
Female characters in animated series
American female characters in television
Fictional Irish American people
Fictional attempted suicides
Characters created by Seth MacFarlane

sv:Family Guy#Chris Griffin